Yarde is an English surname. Notable people with the surname include:

 Anthony Yarde (born 1981), British boxer
 Edward Yarde (1669–1735), Member of Parliament for Totnes, Devon 1695–1698
 Margaret Yarde (1878–1944), British actress

English-language surnames